The Jackson House is a historic house in Bentonville, Arkansas.  It is a -story wood-frame house, roughly cubical in shape, with a pyramidal roof and an asymmetric facade typical of the Queen Anne style.  It has a wraparound single-story porch, supported by Corinthian columns, with flat sawn balusters.  There is a small Palladian window in a front-facing projecting gable section.  The house was built c. 1902.

The house was listed on the National Register of Historic Places in 1988.

See also
National Register of Historic Places listings in Benton County, Arkansas

References

Houses on the National Register of Historic Places in Arkansas
Victorian architecture in Arkansas
Neoclassical architecture in Arkansas
Houses completed in 1902
Houses in Bentonville, Arkansas
National Register of Historic Places in Bentonville, Arkansas
Historic district contributing properties in Arkansas